Marta Bosquet Aznar (born 16 April 1969) is a Spanish politician of the Citizens party. She was a member of the Parliament of Andalusia from 2015 to 2022, serving as its president from 2018.

Biography
Born in Almería, Bosquet graduated in law from the University of Granada in 1994 and worked in a law firm until setting up her own legal advisory office in 1998. She also taught courses on Criminal Law from 1999 to 2000 at the University of Almería. In 2003, she became a legal consultant for the Independent Group for Almería (GIAL) and joined Citizens in December 2013. She was elected to the Parliament of Andalusia in the 2015 election.

After the 2018 election, the People's Party and Citizens formed the first right-of-centre Regional Government of Andalusia, and Bosquet was chosen as President of the Parliament of Andalusia, the position of speaker. She was the first Citizens member to lead any legislature in Spain. She lost her position when Citizens lost all of its seats in the 2022 election.

Bosquet is a flamenco aficionado and the mother of two children.

References

1969 births
Living people
People from Almería
University of Granada alumni
Academic staff of the University of Almería
20th-century Spanish lawyers
21st-century  Spanish lawyers
Citizens (Spanish political party) politicians
Members of the 10th Parliament of Andalusia
Members of the 11th Parliament of Andalusia
Presidents of legislatures of the autonomous communities of Spain